The 2017 IAAF Road Race Label Events was the tenth edition of the global series of road running competitions given Label status of Gold, Silver or Bronze by the International Association of Athletics Federations (IAAF). The series included 103 road races in total, 50 Gold, 20 Silver and 33 Bronze. In terms of distance, 68 races were marathons, 23 were half marathons, 9 were 10K runs, and three were held over other distances. The series included all six World Marathon Majors in the Gold category.

Joyciline Jepkosgei was the most successful athlete in the series that year, with four wins. Three-time winners Eunice Chumba and Rahma Tusa were the only others to achieve more than two victories in the series. Kenyan and Ethiopian athletes were dominant on the circuit with a Kenyan topping the podium 92 times and an Ethiopian on 65 occasions. Bahrain (9 winners) was the only nation to produce more than five winners, though all of its winners were also Kenyan- or Ethiopian-born. China hosted the highest number of races, at thirteen.

Races

Series summary

By label

By country

Multiple winners

References

Race calendar
Calendar 2017 IAAF Label Road Races. IAAF. Retrieved 2019-09-22.

2017
IAAF Road Race Label Events